= Hilda Sokol =

American politician

Member of the New Hampshire House of Representatives
- In office 2000–2006

Personal details
- Born: December 19, 1928 St. Louis, Missouri, U.S.
- Died: November 2, 2022 (aged 93) Hanover, New Hampshire, U.S.
- Party: Democratic
- Education: Hunter College; Harvard University

Hilda Sokol was an American Democratic politician who served in the New Hampshire House of Representatives from 2000 to 2006 where she represented Hanover, New Hampshire.
